At least two warships of Japan have borne the name Myōkō:

 , was a  launched in 1927 and scuttled in 1946
 , is a  launched in 1994

Japanese Navy ship names